The Only Ones were an English rock band formed in London in 1976, whose original band members are Peter Perrett, Alan Mair, John Perry and Mike Kellie, they first disbanded in 1982. They were associated with punk rock, yet straddled the musical territory in between punk, power pop and hard rock, with noticeable influences from psychedelia.

The Only Ones reformed in 2007 after their biggest hit "Another Girl, Another Planet" experienced a resurgence of public interest. The band completed a comeback UK tour in June 2007, and continued touring throughout 2008 and 2009. New material was recorded in 2009 and played live, but was never released.

History
The Only Ones were originally formed in August 1976 in South London by Peter Perrett. Perrett had been recording demos since 1972, and in late 1975 he was looking for a bass player. He was introduced to John Perry as a possible candidate, but Perry wanted to concentrate on playing guitar instead. By August 1976, Perry and Perrett had found drummer Mike Kellie (ex-Spooky Tooth) and bass guitarist Alan Mair, who previously had huge success with the Scottish band The Beatstalkers. Their first single, "Lovers of Today", self-released on the Vengeance record label, was immediately made "record of the week" by three of the four main music papers. A year later they signed to CBS. Their next single "Another Girl, Another Planet" became a popular and influential song, and remains the band's best-known song. It is often featured on various musical box-sets featuring a punk rock or new wave theme. After its inclusion on the 1991 compilation album The Sound of the Suburbs, it was re-released as a single and reached no. 57 in the UK singles chart.

The band released their debut studio album The Only Ones in 1978, which was well received by both reviewers and fans. The band's follow-up album, Even Serpents Shine, was released the following year. A year later, they released their final studio album, Baby's Got a Gun. In the summer of 1980, they supported the Who on their tour of the United States, and in 1982 the band officially disbanded. In subsequent years, the Only Ones retained a following and their posthumously released records – live performances, BBC Television and radio shows, and compilation albums – now outnumber their studio albums. Unusually, The Only Ones' discs were never deleted from the CBS catalogue and remain in-print.

Reunions
In an interview published in the 10 November 2006 issue of the tabloid newspaper, The Daily Record, Alan Mair commented that he was set to reform The Only Ones after "Another Girl, Another Planet" was used in a Vodafone ad campaign in 2006, and picked up as the introduction theme to Irish DJ Dave Fanning's radio show. On 21 February 2007, Perry confirmed via his MySpace page that the band would reform for a five-date UK tour in June. Besides these dates, they played a number of festivals, debuting at All Tomorrow's Parties festival in Minehead, England, on 27 April. During the summer, they also played at the two-part Wireless Festival in Hyde Park, London, Harewood House, (near Leeds), and the Connect Music Festival at Inveraray Castle in Scotland on 1 September.

News of the tour prompted coverage in several UK national newspapers and the dates were met with positive reviews. During these gigs, the band played a new song called "Dreamt She Could Fly".

The press also reported that three of the band were keen to record a new studio album following the tour, but that Perrett seemed hesitant. In April 2008, the band were seen on Later... with Jools Holland performing their song, "Another Girl, Another Planet", and a new song entitled "Black Operations". The band also played other new songs including "Is This How Much You Care" and "Magic Tablet" live on a Canal+ TV special in Paris and an acoustic/unplugged session for Radio 6 Queens of Noize. A live DVD of the Shepherd's Bush Empire show was released in March 2008. Other rumoured releases included DVDs from a show on the band's last US tour, and a re-release of Faster Than Lightning, which was released on VHS in 1991 and on DVD in 2012.

All three CBS studio albums, remastered by Alan Mair, were re-released with bonus tracks in February 2009. "Another Girl, Another Planet" was used in the film D.E.B.S. (2004), as well as in the 2010 hit film Paul. Sony BMG announced a January 2012 release date for an Only Ones box set in the "Original Album Classics" series. The set comprised the three remastered studio albums, plus various B-sides and out-takes. The Only Ones topped the bill at the 2012 Rebellion Festival in Blackpool on 4 August of that year.

In late 2014, the Only Ones (minus Mike Kellie) played some gigs in Tokyo, co-headlining with the Flamin' Groovies. In August 2014, Perrett began playing solo shows (Felipop festival, Spain) using his sons' band Strangefruit, followed by more dates in 2015 (Hebden Bridge, Bristol, London etc.) with the same formation. The band ceased activity after the death of drummer Mike Kellie, but Perrett, Mair and Perry reunited to play a three-song set in summer 2019

Influence
The band members' musical proficiency distinguished them from most of their peers. Their dominant drug-related lyrical themes on songs such as "Another Girl, Another Planet," and "The Big Sleep," also fit in with the Zeitgeist of the era on both sides of the Atlantic. Perrett and Kellie caught the eye of Johnny Thunders, founding member of the New York Dolls and the Heartbreakers, and worked as sidemen on Thunders' solo debut album, So Alone, notably appearing together on the classic "You Can't Put Your Arms Around a Memory". However, drug addiction, particularly heroin use, derailed their career, and singer/guitarist/songwriter Perrett has only sporadically been heard from since the band split in 1982. He briefly resurfaced in the mid 1990s with the album, Woke Up Sticky, and released his debut solo album, How The West Was Won in 2017.

Lead guitarist Perry went on to play as a session guitarist for artists including The Sisters of Mercy, Evan Dando and Marianne Faithfull. More recently, he has written several well received music biographies on the Who's seminal hits compilation Meaty Beaty Big and Bouncy, the Rolling Stones' double album Exile on Main Street and in 2004, Jimi Hendrix's Electric Ladyland. During 2005–2006, he played and recorded with singer-songwriter Freddie Stevenson.

The Only Ones have been influential on the indie rock and alternative rock scenes ever since their initial success, on bands such as The Replacements, Blur, Nirvana, and more recently The Libertines. Several bands have covered their song "Another Girl, Another Planet", including The Libertines (at London Forum with Perrett guesting), The Replacements and Blink 182. Their song "The Whole of the Law" was covered by Yo La Tengo on their album, Painful.

Discography

Studio albums
 The Only Ones (1978)
 Even Serpents Shine (1979)
 Baby's Got a Gun (1980)

References

External links
 

English punk rock groups
English new wave musical groups
Musical groups established in 1976
Musical groups disestablished in 1982
1976 establishments in England
1982 disestablishments in England
Musical groups from London
English power pop groups
English indie rock groups
Musical groups reestablished in 2007
Columbia Records artists
Epic Records artists